Kenneth Aspestrand (born 1972) is a Norwegian trick shooter with a shotgun. He has shot actively since 1999, and trains on his own private shooting range.

Merits 

 Current World Record holder of 9 clay targets shot in 1.88 seconds
 Current World Record holder of 7 clay targets shot upside down
 3rd place European Shotgun Championship
 1st and 2nd place Nordic Shotgun Championship
 21 Norwegian Shotgun Championship medals

References 

1972 births
World record holders in shooting
Norwegian male sport shooters
Living people
Place of birth missing (living people)